Vagococcus martis is a Gram-positive, coccus-shaped facultative aerobic and non-motile bacterium from the genus of Vagococcus which has been isolated from the small intestine of a Yellow-throated marten.

References 

Lactobacillales
Bacteria described in 2017